Napoca can refer to:
 Cluj-Napoca, a major city in Transylvania, Romania
 Napoca (ancient city), an ancient Roman settlement in Dacia, on the location of present-day Cluj-Napoca
 Napoca (castra), the Roman fort for the ancient city Napoca
 Napoca (spider), a genus of jumping spiders known only from Israel, named after the ancient city